Thanas Shkurti (died 31 July 2012) was an Albanian diplomat. He served as Permanent Representative of Albania to the United Nations from 1992 to 1994.

Biography
Shkurti served as Permanent Representative of Albania to the United Nations from 1992 to 1994. He died on 31 July 2012.

References 

Permanent Representatives of Albania to the United Nations
2012 deaths
Year of birth missing